Edens Edge is the self-titled debut album of the American country music group Edens Edge. It was released on June 12, 2012 via Big Machine Records. Its first single, "Amen," was released in March 2011. It includes four of the five songs from their debut EP. The second single, "Too Good to Be True," was released April 2012. Mark Bright and Dann Huff produced the album.

In June 2012, the album was re-released as a deluxe edition exclusive to Cracker Barrel Old Country Store, featuring three bonus tracks, produced by the band members themselves.

Track listing

Personnel
From Edens Edge Cracker Barrel deluxe edition liner notes.

Edens Edge
Hannah Blaylock – lead vocals
Dean Berner – Dobro, acoustic guitar, lap steel guitar, ganjo, background vocals
Cherrill Green – banjo, bouzouki, acoustic guitar, mandolin, background vocals

Additional musicians
Bruce Bouton – steel guitar
Nick Buda – drums
Tom Bukovac – electric guitar, piano
J.T. Corenflos – electric guitar
Stuart Duncan – fiddle
Lester Estelle – drums on "Roots", "Little Bird", and "Wherever I Go"
Shannon Forrest – drums
Mark Hill – bass guitar
Dann Huff – electric guitar
Charlie Judge – keyboards
Jerry McPherson – electric guitar
Mike Rojas – keyboards
Jimmie Lee Sloas – bass guitar
Ilya Toshinsky – banjo, Dobro, acoustic guitar, electric guitar, resonator guitar
 Mark Trussell – acoustic guitar on "Roots", "Little Bird", and "Wherever I Go"

Technical
Mark Bright – production (tracks 1, 2, 5, 6)
Edens Edge – production (tracks 11–13)
Dann Huff – production (tracks 3, 4, 7, 8–10)

Charts

Weekly charts

Year-end charts

Singles

References

2012 debut albums
Edens Edge albums
Big Machine Records albums
Albums produced by Mark Bright (record producer)
Albums produced by Dann Huff